Stalinism is a theory and practice for developing a communist society.

Stalinism may also refer to:

 Marxism–Leninism, the state ideology of the Soviet Union developed by Stalin
 Neo-Stalinism, the posthumous promotion of Stalin and his political theory
 Stalinism (EP), 1981 EP by The Stalin
 Stalinism (album), 1987 compilation album by The Stalin
 Stalinist architecture, the architecture of the Soviet Union under the leadership of Stalin

See also 
 Stalin, alias of Ioseb Besarionis dzе Jughashvili
 Stalinisme, 1944 French-language booklet by Vindex (Giselher Wirsing)
 Stalin Society, a British pro-Stalin discussion group